Kipp Hamilton (born Rita Marie Hamilton; August 16, 1934 – January 29, 1981) was an American actress. She was the younger sister of producer Joe Hamilton and the sister-in-law of Carol Burnett.

Early life and family 
She was born Rita Marie Hamilton on August 16, 1934, in Los Angeles, California, the youngest of six children of Joseph and Marie Hamilton. One of her older brothers was producer and actor Joe Hamilton, who later married comedian Carol Burnett.

Career 
Hamilton made her film debut in a supporting role in the RKO Radio Pictures drama On Our Very Own (1950). In March 1953, she was named "Miss Optometry" by the New York State Association of Optometrists. In mid-1955, Hamilton signed a seven-year contract with 20th Century Fox. Shortly after signing with Fox, Hamilton (along with nine other up-and-coming actresses, including Anita Ekberg and Lori Nelson) was named a "Deb Star of 1955". That same year, Hamilton was cast in her first major role in the drama Good Morning, Miss Dove, playing Jincey Baker.

The following year, Hamilton asked to be released from her contract with Fox. Throughout the remainder of the 1950s, Hamilton appeared in guest roles on Perry Mason, Meet McGraw, Richard Diamond, Private Detective, The Life and Legend of Wyatt Earp, The Texan, and 77 Sunset Strip. In 1959, Hamilton appeared in a supporting role in Never So Few.

Later that same year, she signed with Hecht Hill Lancaster (the production company partially owned by actor Burt Lancaster) and was cast in the Western The Unforgiven (1960). She also had a nightclub act that she performed at Lou Black's Living Room, a club in Montreal, Quebec, Canada.

In November 1963, Hamilton began touring in the road production of the musical How to Succeed in Business Without Really Trying. She remained with the production until mid-1964. In 1965, she returned to television with the guest-starring role on the Bewitched episode "Pleasure O'Reilly" as the title character. The following year, Henry G. Saperstein cast Hamilton in what was her final film role, a singer in The War of the Gargantuas, a Japanese kaiju movie. Billed as a "special guest star", Hamilton performs the song "The Words Get Stuck in My Throat", which later was covered by Devo. Hamilton's final onscreen role was in a 1967 episode of The Virginian.

Personal life 
In 1958, Hamilton dated and later became engaged to film mogul Adolph Zukor's son Eugene (also known as Adolph Zukor III), an executive at Paramount Pictures. Hamilton called off the engagement in March 1959 while she was filming The Unforgiven in Durango, Mexico.

In February 1962, Hamilton married director Dave Geisel, whom she had met on the set of The Garry Moore Show, which her brother Joe produced. They had a daughter, Marie, in 1963 and separated the following year. They were divorced in June 1965. Geisel died in 1969.

Later years and death 
After retiring from acting, Hamilton married Beverly Hills lawyer Donald Thorman Rosenfeld in February 1968. They had a daughter, Dana, in October 1968. She continued to act in regional theater until her death from breast cancer on January 29, 1981, aged 46. She is buried in Holy Cross Cemetery in Culver City, California. In July 2022, Kipp was profiled in Classic Images, in which her daughters and co-stars discussed her onscreen career.

Filmography

References

External links 

 
 

1934 births
1981 deaths
20th-century American actresses
20th Century Studios contract players
Deaths from cancer in California
Deaths from breast cancer
Actresses from Los Angeles
Female models from California
American women pop singers
American film actresses
American musical theatre actresses
American stage actresses
American television actresses
Traditional pop music singers
Western (genre) film actresses
20th-century American women singers
20th-century American singers